The American Association for the Advancement of Science (AAAS), founded in 1848, is the world's largest general scientific society. It serves 262 affiliated societies and academies of science and engineering, representing 10 million individuals worldwide. It is publisher of the journal Science, which has the largest paid circulation of any peer-reviewed general science journal in the world and an estimated total readership of 1 million. AAAS fulfills its mission to "advance science and serve society" through initiatives in science policy; international programs; science education; communication; and more. It is a non-profit organization, with membership open to everyone.

AAAS presidents serve a one-year term, beginning in mid-February at the close of the AAAS Annual Meeting. In accordance with the convention used by the AAAS, presidents are referenced based on the year in which they left office. The presidential term is preceded by a one-year term as president-elect, and followed by a one-year term as chair of the AAAS Board of Directors.

List of presidents

 1848: William C. Redfield
 1849: Joseph Henry
 1850: Alexander Dallas Bache
 1851: Louis Agassiz
 1852: Benjamin Peirce
 1853: Presidency Vacant
 1854: James D. Dana
 1855: John Torrey
 1856: James Hall
 1857: Alexis Caswell
 1857: Jacob Whitman Bailey
 1858: Jeffries Wyman
 1859: Stephen Alexander
 1860: Isaac Lea
 1861-5: Presidency vacant
 1866: F. A. P. Barnard
 1867: J. S. Newberry
 1868: Benjamin A. Gould
 1869: J. W. Foster
 1870: T. Sterry Hunt
 1870: William Chauvenet
 1871: Asa Gray
 1872: J. Lawrence Smith
 1873: Joseph Lovering
 1874: John L. LeConte
 1875: Julius Erasmus Hilgard
 1876: William B. Rogers
 1877: Simon Newcomb
 1878: Othniel Charles Marsh
 1879: George F. Barker
 1880: Lewis H. Morgan
 1881: George J. Brush
 1882: J. W. Dawson
 1883: Charles A. Young
 1884: J. P. Lesley
 1885: H. A. Newton
 1886: Edward S. Morse
 1887: Samuel P. Langley
 1888: John Wesley Powell
 1889: T. C. Mendenhall
 1890: George L. Goodale
 1891: Albert B. Prescott
 1892: Joseph LeConte
 1893: William Harkness
 1894: Daniel G. Brinton
 1895: Edward W. Morley
 1896: Theodore Gill
 1896: Edward Drinker Cope
 1897: Oliver Wolcott Gibbs
 1897: W J McGee (Acting President)
 1898: Frederic Ward Putnam
 1899: Grove Karl Gilbert
 1899: Marcus Benjamin
 1899: Edward Francis Orton
 1900: R. S. Woodward
 1901: Charles S. Minot
 1902: Ira Remsen
 1902: Asaph Hall
 1903: Carroll D. Wright
 1904: W. G. Farlow
 1905: Calvin M. Woodward
 1906: William H. Welch
 1907: E. L. Nichols
 1908: Thomas C. Chamberlin
 1909: David Starr Jordan
 1910: Albert A. Michelson
 1911: Charles E. Bessey
 1912: E. C. Pickering
 1913: Edmund B. Wilson
 1914: Charles W. Eliot
 1915: William Wallace Campbell
 1916: Charles R. Van Hise
 1917: Theodore W. Richards
 1918: John Merle Coulter
 1919: Simon Flexner
 1920: Leland O. Howard
 1921: Eliakim H. Moore
 1922: J. Playfair McMurrich
 1923: Charles D. Walcott
 1924: James McKeen Cattell
 1925: Michael I. Pupin
 1926: Liberty Hyde Bailey
 1927: Arthur Amos Noyes
 1928: Henry F. Osborn
 1929: Robert A. Millikan
 1930: Thomas H. Morgan
 1931: Franz Boas
 1932: John Jacob Abel
 1933: Henry N. Russell
 1934: Edward L. Thorndike
 1935: Karl T. Compton
 1936: Edwin G. Conklin
 1937: George D. Birkhoff
 1938: Wesley C. Mitchell
 1939: Walter B. Cannon
 1940: Albert F. Blakeslee
 1941: Irving Langmuir
 1942: Arthur H. Compton
 1943: Isaiah Bowman
 1944: Anton J. Carlson
 1945: James B. Conant
 1946: C. F. Kettering
 1947: Harlow Shapley
 1948: Edmund Ware Sinnott
 1949: Elvin C. Stakman
 1950: Roger Adams
 1951: Kirtley Fletcher Mather
 1952: Detlev W. Bronk
 1953: Edward U. Condon
 1954: Warren Weaver
 1955: George W. Beadle
 1956: Paul B. Sears
 1957: Laurence H. Snyder
 1958: Wallace R. Brode
 1959: Paul E. Klopsteg
 1960: Chauncey D. Leake
 1961: Thomas Park
 1962: Paul M. Gross
 1963: Alan T. Waterman
 1964: Laurence M. Gould
 1965: Henry Eyring
 1966: Alfred S. Romer
 1967: Don K. Price
 1968: Walter Orr Roberts
 1969: H. Bentley Glass
 1970: Athelstan Spilhaus
 1971: Mina Rees
 1972: Glenn T. Seaborg
 1973: Leonard M. Rieser
 1974: Roger Revelle
 1975: Margaret Mead
 1976: William D. McElroy
 1977–1978: Emilio Q. Daddario
 1979: Edward E. David Jr.
 1980: Kenneth E. Boulding
 1981: Frederick Mosteller
 1982: D. Allan Bromley
 1983: E. Margaret Burbidge
 1984: Anna J. Harrison
 1985: David A. Hamburg
 1986: Gerard Piel
 1987: Lawrence Bogorad
 1988: Sheila E. Widnall
 1989: Walter E. Massey
 1990: Richard C. Atkinson
 1991: Donald N. Langenberg
 1992: Leon M. Lederman
 1993: F. Sherwood Rowland
 1994: Eloise E. Clark
 1995: Francisco J. Ayala
 1996: Rita R. Colwell
 1997: Jane Lubchenco
 1998: Mildred S. Dresselhaus
 1999: M. R. C. Greenwood
 2000: Stephen Jay Gould
 2001: Mary L. Good
 2002: Peter H. Raven
 2003: Floyd E. Bloom
 2004: Mary Ellen Avery
 2005: Shirley Ann Jackson
 2006: Gilbert S. Omenn
 2007: John Holdren
 2008: David Baltimore
 2009: James J. McCarthy
 2010: Peter Agre
 2011: Alice S. Huang
 2012: Nina Fedoroff
 2013: William H. Press
 2014: Phillip A. Sharp
 2015: Gerald Fink
 2016: Geraldine L. Richmond
 2017: Barbara A. Schaal
 2018: Susan Hockfield
 2019: Margaret Hamburg
 2020: Steven Chu
 2021: Claire Fraser

Notes:
 Jacob Whitman Bailey died on 26 February 1857, at the beginning of his term of office as Association President.
 Between 1861 and 1865 the American Civil War created political pressures that led to the indefinite postponement of all AAAS events during that period. See AAAS history for more information.

References

External links 
 List of Presidents of the American Association for the Advancement of Science from the American Association for the Advancement of Science website

American Association for the Advancement of Science
 
American Association for the Advancement of Science